Richard Francis (Rick) Vito (born October 13, 1949, in Darby, Pennsylvania, United States) is an American guitarist and singer.  He was part of Fleetwood Mac between 1987 and 1991. Vito took over as lead guitarist after Lindsey Buckingham left the group. He is best known for his blues and slide guitar style, whose influences include Elmore James, Robert Nighthawk, B.B. King, Alvino Rey, Les Paul, George Harrison, and Keith Richards.

Vito began his professional career in 1971 upon moving to Los Angeles and subsequently joining Delaney & Bonnie & Friends, also working with Todd Rundgren and Derek & The Dominoes’ Bobby Whitlock. Vito has been a featured player on Bob Seger's albums since 1986.  He played the slide guitar solo on the Bob Seger song (and Chevy truck TV commercial), "Like a Rock". He was a long-standing member of Bonnie Raitt's touring band in the 1980s and 1990s. Vito also recorded and/ or performed with John Mayall, Jackson Browne, Little Richard, Roger McGuinn, Roy Orbison, Dobie Gray, John Fogerty, Stevie Nicks, Albert Collins, Dolly Parton, Maria Muldaur, and many others. Vito has had ten solo CD releases and tours often in Europe and the US with his own band. He produced rockabilly singer Rosie Flores' CD, Speed of Sound. His CD/DVD production collaboration with Mick Fleetwood, Blue Again!, received a Grammy nomination in 2010. Vito is also the recipient of the W.C. Handy Blues Award. Mojo on My Side was released in Europe in 2014, and worldwide in 2015 on Delta Groove Records with two new tracks. His latest CD, Soulshaker, was released on 5 April 2019.

Vito performed with the Mick Fleetwood Blues Band at Byron Bay Bluesfest over Easter 2016. He also participated in an all-star tribute to Fleetwood Mac founder Peter Green at the London Palladium in February 2020. Billed as "Mick Fleetwood & Friends," the show highlighted Vito's guitar and vocals alongside of Billy Gibbons, Pete Townshend, David Gilmour, Jonny Lang, John Mayall, Christine McVie, Bill Wyman, Jeremy Spencer and more.

Fleetwood Mac

In 1987, Lindsey Buckingham quit Fleetwood Mac before the band began their Tango In The Night Tour. Fleetwood Mac Drummer Mick Fleetwood asked Billy Burnette to join the group as the lead guitarist, but Burnette declined to join unless his friend Rick Vito also joined, and Vito was named lead guitarist. Fleetwood accepted and Vito and Burnette joined Fleetwood Mac in September 1987. Vito quit Fleetwood Mac in November 1991 to begin working on a solo career. Despite his departure from the group, Vito joined his former bandmates Christine McVie, Mick Fleetwood, Burnette, and John McVie to play the pre-game show of Super Bowl XXVII in January 1993. Vito later joined the Mick Fleetwood Blues Band in 2008 and recorded a live album, Blue Again!, which was nominated for a Grammy Award for Best Blues Album in 2010.

Filmography
Jealousy (1984) (TV) singer
The Last Castle (2001) Red Team leader
Angel Eyes (2005) (songwriter: "It's 2 A.M.")
Firewall (2006) (songwriter and performer: "She's So Crazy")

Discography

 1969 The Wright Brothers (an unreleased 4-song EP, recorded/produced by colleague Neil Kempfer-Stocker; Vito-lead guitar).

Fleetwood Mac
 1988 Greatest Hits - guitars and backing vocals on two songs.
 1990 Behind the Mask 
 1992 25 Years – The Chain 
 2002 The Very Best of Fleetwood Mac

The Mick Fleetwood Blues Band Featuring Rick Vito
 2008 : Blue Again!
 2016 : Live at the Belly Up Tavern

Solo albums
 1992 King of Hearts
 1998 Pink & Black
 2000 Lucky Devils
 2001 Crazy Cool
 2003 Band Box Boogie
 2005 Rattlesnake Shake
 2006 Talk That Talk
 2009 Lucky in Love: The Best of Rick Vito
 2014 Mojo on My Side (European Version)
 2015 Mojo on My Side (Worldwide Version)
 2019 Soulshaker

Guest performances
 1972 Something/Anything? – Todd Rundgren
 1972 Raw Velvet – Bobby Whitlock
 1973 “They Love Me, They Love Me Not”- Genya Ravan
 1973 "All I See Is You" - Rabindra Danks
 1975 New Year, New Band, New Company – John Mayall
 1975 Common Sense – John Prine
 1975 Change – Spanky and Our Gang
 1975 Notice to Appear – John Mayall
 1975 Growing Pains – Jamie Owens 
 1976 A Banquet in Blues – John Mayall
 1976 Prime Prine – John Prine
 1976 Street Talk – Bob Crewe
 1977 Playing to an Audience Of One – David Soul
 1977 Thunderbyrd – Roger McGuinn
 1978 Kissin' in the California Sun – Katy Moffatt
 1978 Randy Richards – Randy Richards
 1979 High and Outside – Steve Goodman
 1979 Open Your Eyes – Maria Muldaur
 1980 Blue Delicacies – Ronnie Barron
 1980 No More Interviews – John Mayall
 1982 Fast Times at Ridgemont High (Original Soundtrack) – Various/Jackson Browne
 1982 Green Light – Bonnie Raitt
 1982 The Perfect Stranger – Jesse Colin Young
 1982 Revenge Will Come – Greg Copeland
 1982 Walk On – Karen Brooks
 1983 Lawyers in Love – Jackson Browne
 1983 Tell Me the Truth – Timothy B Schmit
 1984 Inside the Fire – Rita Coolidge
 1985 One Heart at a Time – Don Francisco
 1986 Like a Rock – Bob Seger
 1986 Lives in the Balance – Jackson Browne
 1987 A Very Special Christmas – Various/Bob Seger
 1987 Rainbow – Dolly Parton
 1989 Mystery Girl – Roy Orbison
 1989 Rock Rhythm & Blues – Various/Christine McVie
 1990 Gypsy Moon – Troy Newman
 1990 Brent Bourgeois – Brent Bourgeois
 1991 The Fire Inside – Bob Seger
 1992 Born to Rock and Roll – Roger McGuinn
 1992 Not Alone – Thomas Jefferson Kaye
 1993 Great Days: A John Prine Anthology – John Prine
 1994 Craig Shoemaker Meets the Lovemaster – Craig Shoemaker
 1994 Greatest Hits – Bob Seger
 1994 Peter Frampton – Peter Frampton
 1994 Meet Me at Midnite – Maria Muldaur
 1995 It's a Mystery – Bob Seger
 1995 All Day Thumbsucker Revisited: The History of Blue Thumb Records – Various/John Mayall
 1997 The Next Voice You Hear: The Best of Jackson Browne – Jackson Browne
 1998 Southland of the Heart – Maria Muldaur
 1998 Thinkin' About You – Rita Coolidge
 1999 Extremely Cool – Chuck E. Weiss
 1999 Steel Cowboys: Bikers' Choice, Vol. 1 – Various/Billy Burnette
 1999 Lillith Fair Volume 3 – Bonnie Raitt
 1999 The ABC Years – John Mayall
 1999 Juke Rhythm – John "Juke" Logan
 1999 Smooth Sailin' – Marty Grebb
 2001 Nothing Personal – Delbert McClinton
 2002 Forgive – Rebecca Lynn Howard
 2002 Almeria Club – Hank Williams Jr.
 2002 Fast Girl – The Tractors
 2002 The Big Night – The Tractors
 2002 Speed of Sound – Rosie Flores
 2003 All Night Breakfast – Jonny Neel
 2004 The Very Best of Jackson Browne – Jackson Browne
 2009 Trading 8s – Carl Verheyen
 2009 Man's Temptation – Kermit Lynch
 2011 Steady Love – Maria Muldaur
 2012 Donuts and Coffee – Kermit Lynch
 2013 Memphis – Boz Scaggs
 2014 Ride Out – Bob Seger
 2015 Slide Guitar Summit – Arlen Roth
 2017 Crazy Like Me - Billy Burnette
 2018 Out of the Blues - Boz Scaggs (LP)
 2018 Unchained Melodies - Roy Orbison
 2020 All American Radio - Ned Evett
 2021 Celebrate the Music of Peter Green
 2021 These Strange Times - Mick Fleetwood

DVDs
 1977 (rel. 2010) Rockpalast – Roger McGuinn's Thunderbyrd: West Coast Legends Vol. 4 DVD
 1988 Fleetwood Mac: Tango in the Night Live DVD
 2003 Rick Vito In Concert DVD
 2003 Guitar Heroes In Concert DVD
 2005 Rick Vito: Complete Slide Guitar DVD
 2009 Mick Fleetwood Blues Band featuring Rick Vito: Blue Again! DVD
 2021 “Celebrate The Music Of Peter Green” DVD

References

External links
 Official site
 Rick Vito Bio
 Rick Vito at IMDB
 Rick Vito Interview NAMM Oral History Library (2021)

1949 births
Living people
People from Darby, Pennsylvania
American rock guitarists
Fleetwood Mac members
American session musicians
Lead guitarists
Slide guitarists
American male singer-songwriters
American singer-songwriters
American rock songwriters
American rock singers
American blues guitarists
American male guitarists
20th-century American guitarists